Lac de Bort-les-Orgues is a lake located on the border of the Cantal, Corrèze and Puy-de-Dôme departments, France. At an elevation of 437 m, its surface area is 10.72 km².

Lakes of Nouvelle-Aquitaine